Jawai is a river originating in Udaipur district in Aravalli Ranges, a tributary of the Luni River.

Sukri river is its main tributary.

Western Rajasthan's largest dam, the Jawai Dam, is located near Sumerpur in Pali district on this river only. The twin cities Sumerpur and Sheoganj in Sirohi district are located on the banks of Jawai river.

References

External links
 Luni tributaries (Department of Irrigation, Government of Rajasthan)

Pali district
Jalore district
Udaipur district
Rivers of Rajasthan
Rivers of India

de:Luni (Fluss in Rajasthan)
ml:ലൂണി നദി